František Čermák and Leoš Friedl were the defending champions, but chose not to defend their title.

Mariusz Fyrstenberg and Marcin Matkowski won the title defeating Martín García and Sebastián Prieto in the final, 6–1, 6–1.

Seeds

Draw

References
 Main Draw

Doubles